Alberto Illanes Puente (born 25 November 1963) is a Bolivian football manager and former player who played as a defender. He is the current manager of Universitario de Vinto.

Career
Illanes was born in Uncía, and played for Magisterio Rural, Universitario de Sucre, The Strongest, Independiente Petrolero and Unión Central before retiring in 2000. Immediately after retiring he took up coaching, after becoming the manager of Stormers San Lorenzo.

In 2001, Illanes returned to his former club Independiente Petrolero; initially an interim manager, he became the side's permanent manager until the end of 2002. He subsequently left to create a football school in Sucre, and only returned to coaching duties in 2005, as Eduardo Villegas' assistant at another former club, The Strongest.

Illanes followed Villegas to Universitario Sucre as his assistant for the 2006 campaign, but was appointed manager of the side on 7 December of that year after Villegas returned to Strongest. He subsequently returned to his assistant role, and returned to work with Villegas in 2010 at Jorge Wilstermann.

In 2012, Illanes became Mauricio Soria's assistant at The Strongest, and subsequently worked with the manager at Wilstermann and Real Potosí. For the 2014 season, he was named manager of the latter club.

In the following years, Illanes worked as Soria's assistant at the Bolivia national team in two periods. On 21 August 2018, he was appointed manager of Nacional Potosí. He left the club in December 2019 after his contract expired, and took over The Strongest the following 9 March.

Sacked by Strongest on 22 April 2021, Illanes was named in charge of Nacional Potosí on 6 August. He resigned on 23 November, and returned to Wilstermann on 8 August 2022, now as manager.

On 31 December 2022, Illanes resigned from Wilstermann, and took over fellow top tier side Universitario de Vinto the following 5 January.

References

External links

1963 births
Living people
Bolivian footballers
Association football defenders
Universitario de Sucre footballers
Bolivian Primera División players
The Strongest players
Club Independiente Petrolero players
Unión Tarija players
Bolivian football managers
Bolivian Primera División managers
Independiente Petrolero managers
Universitario de Sucre managers
Club Real Potosí managers
Nacional Potosí managers
The Strongest managers
C.D. Jorge Wilstermann managers
F.C. Universitario de Vinto managers